James Goldwell (died 15 February 1499) was a medieval Dean of Salisbury and Bishop of Norwich.

Life
Goldwell was one of the sons of William and Avice Goldwell, both of whom died in 1485. He had a brother, Nicholas Goldwell, who survived him. He was nominated on 17 July 1472 and was consecrated on 4 October 1472. He died on 15 February 1499.

Career

Goldwell was educated at All Souls' College, Oxford where he graduated B.Can.L. 1449 and D.C.L 1452.

He was appointed:
President of St George's Hall in the Castle, Oxford 1452
Rector of St John the Evangelist, London 1455
Rector of Rivenhall, Essex 1455
Prebendary of Widland in St Paul's Cathedral 1457
Prebendary of Sneating in St Paul's Cathedral 1458
Prebendary of Islington in St Paul's Cathedral 1459 - 1461
Registrar of the Order of the Garter 1460
Rector of Cliffe-at-Hoo, Kent
Archdeacon of Essex, 1461
Canon of Hereford Cathedral 1461
Prebenary of Stratford in Salisbury Cathedral 1462
Dean of Salisbury 1463
Principal Secretary of State to King Edward IV
Master of the Rolls 1471
Papal Protonotary
Bishop of Norwich 1472, consecrated at St Blaise, Rome

Goldwell was appointed to the sixth stall in St George's Chapel, Windsor Castle in 1460 and held this until 1472.

Citations

References

External links
Will of James Goldwell, Bishop of Norwich of Bethersden, Kent, proved 15 February 1499, PROB 11/11/565, National Archives Retrieved 30 November 2013
 

Archdeacons of Essex
Canons of Windsor
Deans of Salisbury
Bishops of Norwich
15th-century English Roman Catholic bishops
15th-century births
1499 deaths
Year of birth missing
Alumni of All Souls College, Oxford
Registrars of the Order of the Garter